The Cabinet of Saint Vincent and the Grenadines is appointed by the Prime Minister.

Current cabinet

2012 cabinet 
As of 28 March 2012.

References

See also 

 Politics of Saint Vincent and the Grenadines

Saint_Vincent_and_the_Grenadines
Politics of Saint Vincent and the Grenadines